Prochoristis malekalis is a moth in the family Crambidae. It is found in Iran.

References

Cybalomiinae
Moths described in 1961